Infante João of Viseu  (c. 1448  1472) was the older son of Infante Fernando, Duke of Viseu and of his wife Infanta Beatrice of Portugal.

In 1470, following his father's death, he inherited the titles of Duke of Viseu and Duke of Beja, as well as the Lordships of Covilhã and Moura.

He also became Master of the Order of Christ and of the Order of Santiago, becoming also Constable of Portugal.

In July 1472, his uncle, King Afonso V granted him the Moroccan city of Anfa (in Portuguese Anafé).

He died young and single, without issue. His brother, Infante Diogo, inherited his titles and estates.

Ancestry

See also
Duke of Beja
Duke of Viseu
List of Portuguese Dukedoms

External links
 Genealogy of John, 3rd Duke of Viseu, in Portuguese

Bibliography
”Nobreza de Portugal e do Brasil” – Vol. II, page 409. Published by Zairol Lda., Lisbon 1989.

House of Aviz
Portuguese infantes
Dukes of Beja
Dukes of Viseu
Portuguese nobility
1440s births
1472 deaths
15th-century Portuguese people
Donatários of the Azores